Utpal Das (born 14 December 1986) is an Assamese film actor. His debut Assamese feature film was Dhon Kuberor Dhon in 2009 while his acting debut was through VCD film Ringa Ringa Mon in 2004.

Career

Films
In 2009, Das made his film debut with Dhon Kuberor Dhon. In 2011, he had a starring role in Munin Baruah's Raamdhenu, which was a major success for the Assamese film industry and led to his casting in more high budget productions. He received critical recognition with a nomination for the Filmfare Awards East  award for best actor male for his performance in the film Durjon.

He starred in VCD films such as Ringa Ringa Mon (2004) which is his first acting venture, Uroniya Mon (2007), Junaki Mon (2008), Janmoni (2008), Abhimani Mon (2009), Bohagot Birinar Biya (2010) and Moromjaan (2011). In the 2016 film  Doordarshan Eti Jantra, he played the role of "Bitul". Some of his notable feature films include Raamdhenu (2011), Rowd (2012), Borolar Ghor (2012), Durjon (2013) and Doordarshan Eti Jantra (2016) and The Underworld (2018).

Television
In parallel with his later film roles, Das has featured in Assamese television serials: Niyoror Phool (News Live Channel), Anuradha (News Live Channel), Tumi Dusokute Kajol Loley (Rang Channel), Moromor Anuradha (Rengoni), and Auxir Jonak (Rang).

Theatre
During 2013–2014, Das starred in theatre productions by the touring company Brindabon Theatre, which completed an extensive tour of Assam. He was involved with Theatre Surjya as the lead actor in the session 2018-19.

Filmography
Films

VCD films

 Ringa Ringa Mon 
 Janmoni 1
 Janmoni 2
 Uronia Mon
 Sunaror Halodhia Hahi
 Chintamoni
 Purnima1
 Purnima2
 Alakananda
 Moromjan 2011
 Faguni
 Priya Milan
 Saneki
 Jonaki Mon

Television

See also
 Jatin Bora
 Ravi Sarma

References

External links

Living people
Indian male film actors
Assamese actors
Indian male television actors
Indian male stage actors
1986 births